Francis D. "Frank" McGee (April 29, 1899 – January 30, 1934) was a Major League Baseball first baseman who played in two games for the Washington Senators in .

External links

1899 births
1934 deaths
Washington Senators (1901–1960) players
Major League Baseball first basemen
Baseball players from Columbus, Ohio
Ohio State Buckeyes baseball players